Yashahime: Princess Half-Demon is a Japanese anime television series and the sequel to Inuyasha, produced by Sunrise. It was first announced in May 2020 and was directed by Teruo Sato with main character designs by Inuyasha original creator Rumiko Takahashi. Most of the main cast and staff have returned, with Katsuyuki Sumisawa in charge of the scripts, Yoshihito Hishinuma in charge of the anime character designs and Kaoru Wada composing the music. The sequel series is set after Inuyasha and his allies destroyed Naraku and the Shikon Jewel. The trio of family daughters began their journey keeping all Rainbow Pearls from villainous siblings. It aired from October 3, 2020 to March 20, 2021 on both Yomiuri TV and Nippon TV. The opening theme "New Era" is performed by the male idol group SixTONES, while the ending theme "Break" is performed by Uru. The second opening theme "Burn" is performed by NEWS, while the second ending theme "Kesshō" is performed by Ryokuōshoku Shakai.

Viz Media announced it had acquired the rights to digital streaming, electronic sell-through (EST), and home video releases of the series for North and Latin American territories. Medialink also announced that it has the rights to the series in Southeast Asian and South Asian territories. Viz Media streamed the series on Crunchyroll, Funimation, and Hulu. On October 26, 2020, Funimation announced a partnership with Viz Media to release an English dub of the series, with most of the English cast of Inuyasha reprising their roles. The English dub of the series was broadcast on Adult Swim's Toonami programming block beginning on June 27, 2021.


Episode list

Home media release

Japanese

English

Notes

References

2020 Japanese television seasons
2021 Japanese television seasons
Yashahime